The Municipal Park is a public urban park in Luxembourg City, in southern Luxembourg.  The eastern edge flanks the boulevard du Prince Henri and, along with the valleys of the Alzette and Pétrusse, forms a boundary that separates the central Ville Haute quarter from the rest of the city.

This green arc is segmented into separate sections by the avenue Monterey, the avenue Émile Reuter, and the avenue de la Porte-Neuve. The southernmost section of the park is called Edith Klein Park (Parc Ed. Klein). The park was created after the demolition of the fortress under the 1867 Treaty of London.

The park is the location of the Villa Louvigny, in the southernmost section, and the Villa Vauban, across the avenue Émile Reuter.  The Villa Louvigny was the seat of the Compagnie Luxembourgeoise de Télédiffusion, the forerunner of RTL Group, and hosted the Eurovision Song Contest in 1962 and 1966.  The Villa Vauban was the original seat of the European Court of Justice, and is now an art museum.

During the excavation for the construction of the underground Monterey car park, the remains of the fort was uncovered. Named the Lambert Redoubt, the pentagonal fortress can now be seen just south of avenue Monterey. The Lambert Fortress was originally built in 1685, renovated in 1835–6, and razed between 1868 and 1874.

Footnotes

Parks in Luxembourg City